Ivanushensky is a rural locality (a khutor) in Verkhnecherenskoye Rural Settlement, Kletsky District, Volgograd Oblast, Russia. The population was 77 as of 2010. There are 8 streets.

Geography 
Ivanushensky is located on the bank of the Kurtlak River, 25 km southwest of Kletskaya (the district's administrative centre) by road. Verkhnecherensky is the nearest rural locality.

References 

Rural localities in Kletsky District